Endoclita hoesi is a species of moth of the family Hepialidae. It is known from Borneo. Food plants for this species include Elettaria, Eucalyptus, and Theobroma.

References

External links
Hepialidae genera

Moths described in 1958
Hepialidae